Seyl Kabud (also Romanized as Seyl Kabūd and Sīl Kabūd; also known as Kabood Lar, Kabūdas, Kabūdath, and Kabūdlar) is a village in Zagheh Rural District, Zagheh District, Khorramabad County, Lorestan Province, Iran. At the 2006 census, its population was 51, in 12 families.

References 

Towns and villages in Khorramabad County